1,4-Cycloheptadiene is a highly flammable cycloalkene that occurs as a colorless clear liquid. It can form a yellow complex with palladium.

References

Cycloalkenes
Dienes
Seven-membered rings